This is a list of mayors of Ponce, Puerto Rico's southern economic center, the island's second largest and second most important city.

From 1692 to 1840, the office of mayor in Ponce was filled either by local hacendados or by military officers appointed by the governor, depending on whether the political situation on Spain at the time was that of a constitutional or an absolutist government. From 1840 to 1870, mayors were oftentimes elected by the municipal council, whose members were called regidores. In 1870, political parties were created for the first time and municipal officials were elected by the people at large, and the mayor, as well as the members of the municipal council, would belong to one of the two parties active, either the Partido Liberal Reformista or the Partido Incondicional Español. With the advent of the American political system in Puerto Rico after the American invasion of 1898, the mayor was elected by popular vote, which is the system still (2019) in place.

Ponce's first mayor was Don Pedro Sánchez de Mathos, in 1692, appointed by governor Juan Robles de Lorenzana. Ponce elected its first mayor (as well as its first Municipal Assembly) on 20 September 1812. Its first elected mayor was José Ortiz de la Renta, who took office in 1812. Ortiz de la Renta occupied the post of mayor on eight occasions between 1812 and 1846. 

The current mayor of Ponce is Luis Irizarry Pabón, elected in 2020, from the Partido Popular Democratico and who succeeded María "Mayita" Meléndez Altieri of the Partido Nuevo Progresista. Mayita had been the first woman elected to the office of mayor by the people of Ponce in its extensive political history. She was also the first mayor of a party other than the Popular Democratic Party in Ponce since 1989, when Rafael "Churumba" Cordero Santiago won the elections and took the oath of office that same year.

Throughout the centuries the Ponce municipal heads of government listed here as "mayors" may have held titles different from the modern title of "Mayor". Some of the other titles held were Teniente a guerra, Corregidor, Alcalde mayor, Alcalde ordinario,  Justicia mayor, Alcalde constitucional, Alcalde en propiedad, Alcalde real ordinario, and Comandante militar. Regardless of the titles held, the people listed here were the maximum civil authority at the municipal level. In the lists that follow, "Alcalde" refers to the Spanish colonial position attained via election by the regidores (council members) of the municipal council, and refers to someone who had both judicial and administrative functions. "Mayor", on the other hand, refers to a local executive, elected by the people, with administrative functions only.

18th century
Source: Eduardo Neumann Gandía, Enciclopedia de Puerto Rico, and Neysa Rodríguez Deynes.

19th century
Sources: Eduardo Neumann Gandía, Enciclopedia de Puerto Rico, and Neysa Rodríguez Deynes.

20th century

21st century

Other mayors
Following is a list of other Ponce mayors according to Enciclopedia Puerto Rico but which are not accounted for in the 1913 historical account by Eduardo Neumann Gandía, Verdadera y Auténtica Historia de la Ciudad de Ponce: Desde sus Primitivos Tiempos hasta la Época Contemporánea. Source: Enciclopedia de Puerto Rico. Some of the names in this list (such as Tomás de Renovales, Francisco Vassallo and Antonio Toro) are listed in Neumann's book, but not for the additional time periods indicated in Enciclopedia Puerto Rico (and, thus, in the table that follows). The positions held are all generically listed as "Alcalde" as a placeholder; but, at least for some of them, based on the time periods Enciclopedia Puerto Rico states they served, likely held a title other than "Alcalde".

Pre-1692 mayors 
Historians Eli D. Oquendo Rodriguez (De Criadero a Partido: Ojeada a la historia de los orígenes de Ponce, 1645-1810. 2015. p. 31.) and Francisco Lluch Mora (Orígenes y Fundación de Ponce. 2006, p. 101.) allude to various other Ponce municipal magistrates in the years preceding 1692. Among them are Juan de Quiñones (Lluch Mora), and Juan Quiñones, Pedro Sanchez, Juan Joseph Ortiz, and Andres Martinez de Quiñones (Oquendo Rodriguez).

See also
 
Timeline of Ponce, Puerto Rico
Mayoralty in Puerto Rico
Cabildo
Cabildo insular
Corregimiento
Tierra Firme
Spanish military cultural legacy

Notes

Footnotes

References

Further reading
 Fernando Bayrón Toro, and Puerto Rico State Elections Commission. Estadísticas de las elecciones municipales de Puerto Rico : (1900-1988). Mayagüez, P.R. : Editorial Isla. 1992.
 Fay Fowlie de Flores. Ponce, Perla del Sur: Una Bibliografía Anotada. Second Edition. 1997. Ponce, Puerto Rico: Universidad de Puerto Rico en Ponce. p. 196. Item 1003. 
 "Cuadro sinóptico de las autoridades locales de Ponce, 1692 - 1972." Boletín de la Academia de Artes y Ciencias de Puerto Rico. Volumen 8 (Octubre-Diciembre 1972.) pp. 379–384. (CUTPO).
 Fay Fowlie de Flores. Ponce, Perla del Sur: Una Bibliografía Anotada. Second Edition. 1997. Ponce, Puerto Rico: Universidad de Puerto Rico en Ponce. p. 243. Item 1231. 
 Ramon E. Miranda Torres. "Don Jose Ortiz de la Renta en la Historia de Ponce." Dialogo. Diciembre 1986-Enero 1987. page 28.
 Fay Fowlie de Flores. Ponce, Perla del Sur: Una Bibliografía Anotada. Second Edition. 1997. Ponce, Puerto Rico: Universidad de Puerto Rico en Ponce. p. 243. Item 1232. 
 Ramon E. Miranda Torres. "Don Jose Ortiz de la Renta en la Historia de Ponce." Tesis de Maestría (In Spanish). San Juan, Puerto Rico: Centro de Estudios Avanzados de Puerto Rico y el Caribe. 1986. (Archivo Histórico de Ponce, AHP / Centro de Estudios Avanzados de Puerto Rico y el Caribe, CEAPRC / Colegio Universitario Tecnológico de Ponce, CUTPO)
 Fay Fowlie de Flores. Ponce, Perla del Sur: Una Bibliografía Anotada. Second Edition. 1997. Ponce, Puerto Rico: Universidad de Puerto Rico en Ponce. p. 116. Item 589. 
 Felix Bernier Matos. Cromos ponceños. (por Fray Justo) Ponce, Puerto Rico: Imprenta "La Libertad." 1896. Incluye cobertura sobre Eduardo Lacot. (Colegio Universitario Tecnológico de Ponce, CUTPO)
 Fay Fowlie de Flores. Ponce, Perla del Sur: Una Bibliografía Anotada. Second Edition. 1997. Ponce, Puerto Rico: Universidad de Puerto Rico en Ponce. p. 116. Item 589. 
 Felix Bernier Matos. Cromos ponceños. (por Fray Justo) Ponce, Puerto Rico: Imprenta "La Libertad." 1896. Incluye cobertura sobre Antonio Molina. (Colegio Universitario Tecnológico de Ponce, CUTPO)
 Fay Fowlie de Flores. Ponce, Perla del Sur: Una Bibliografía Anotada. Second Edition. 1997. Ponce, Puerto Rico: Universidad de Puerto Rico en Ponce. p. 335. Item 1667. 
 Villa de Ponce. Presupuesto municipal del ilustre Ayuntamiento de la Villa de Ponce para el año económico de 1874 a 1875. Ponce, Puerto Rico: H. Lara—Imprenta Nueva, 1874. (Biblioteca del Congreso [Washington, D.C.]; Colegio Universitario Tecnológico de Ponce, CUTPO [fotocopia])
 Fay Fowlie de Flores. Ponce, Perla del Sur: Una Bibliografía Anotada. Second Edition. 1997. Ponce, Puerto Rico: Universidad de Puerto Rico en Ponce. p. 335. Item 1671. 
 Ponce. Presupuesto ordinario correspondiente al año económico venidero de 1884 an 85. Ponce, Puerto Rico: Tip. El Comercio, 1884. (Biblioteca del Congreso [Washington, D.C.]; Colegio Universitario Tecnológico de Ponce, CUTPO [fotocopia])
 Fay Fowlie de Flores. Ponce, Perla del Sur: Una Bibliografía Anotada. Second Edition. 1997. Ponce, Puerto Rico: Universidad de Puerto Rico en Ponce. p. 327. Item 1636. 
 Ramon Elices Montes. Memoria reference al estado de la hacienda municipal y servicios públicos de Ponce, al tomas posesión del cargo de alcalde de dicha ciudad el nombrado por decreto del gobernador general de la provincia, fecha 10 de julio de 1886. D. Ramon Elices Montes. Ponce, Puerto Rico: Imprenta "El Vapor". 1886. (CUTPO-fotocopia)
 Fay Fowlie de Flores. Ponce, Perla del Sur: Una Bibliografía Anotada. Second Edition. 1997. Ponce, Puerto Rico: Universidad de Puerto Rico en Ponce. p. 110. Item 566. 
 Guillermo Atiles Garcia. Kaleidoscopio. Ponce, Puerto Rico: Establecimiento tipográfico de Manuel López. 1905. Incluye cobertura sobre Ermelindo Salazar. (Colegio Universitario Tecnológico de Ponce, CUTPO)
 Fay Fowlie de Flores. Ponce, Perla del Sur: Una Bibliografía Anotada. Second Edition. 1997. Ponce, Puerto Rico: Universidad de Puerto Rico en Ponce. p. 116. Item 589. 
 Felix Bernier Matos. Cromos ponceños. (por Fray Justo) Ponce, Puerto Rico: Imprenta "La Libertad." 1896. Incluye cobertura sobre Ermelindo Salazar. (Colegio Universitario Tecnológico de Ponce, CUTPO)
 Fay Fowlie de Flores. Ponce, Perla del Sur: Una Bibliografía Anotada. Second Edition. 1997. Ponce, Puerto Rico: Universidad de Puerto Rico en Ponce. p. 270. Item 1352. 
 Carmen Dolores Trelles. "Ponce: una casa para su historia." El Nuevo Dia. 5 Septiembre 1993. pp. 12–13. 
 Fay Fowlie de Flores. Ponce, Perla del Sur: Una Bibliografía Anotada. Second Edition. 1997. Ponce, Puerto Rico: Universidad de Puerto Rico en Ponce. p. 336. Item 1673. 
 Ponce. Reglamento para el régimen interior de las oficinas del ilustre Ayuntamiento y Alcaldía de la Ciudad, aprobado por dicha Corporación en la sesión del día 6 de junio de 1888. Ponce, Puerto Rico: Tip. de la "Revista de Puerto Rico", 1888. (Universidad de Puerto Rico, Rio Piedras; Colegio Universitario Tecnológico de Ponce, CUTPO [fotocopia])
 Fay Fowlie de Flores. Ponce, Perla del Sur: Una Bibliografía Anotada. Second Edition. 1997. Ponce, Puerto Rico: Universidad de Puerto Rico en Ponce. p. 334. Item 1666. 
 Ponce. Ordenanzas de policía urbana urbana y rural para la ciudad de Ponce y su termino municipal; aprobadas por el Excmo. Sr. Gobernador General en 24 de febrero de 1888. 2. ed. Ponce, Puerto Rico: Imprenta de Manuel Lopez, 1904. (Universidad de Puerto Rico, Rio Piedras)
 Fay Fowlie de Flores. Ponce, Perla del Sur: Una Bibliografía Anotada. Second Edition. 1997. Ponce, Puerto Rico: Universidad de Puerto Rico en Ponce. p. 208. Item 1072. 
 Roman Baldorioty de Castro. "Carta de Roman Baldorioty de Castro a Rafael Maria de Labra sobre diversos asuntos de suma importancia para la Isla de Puerto Rico; Ponce; enero 8, 1889." Historia. Vol 3 (abril de 1953) pp. 119–124. (Colegio Universitario Tecnológico de Ponce, CUTPO).
 Fay Fowlie de Flores. Ponce, Perla del Sur: Una Bibliografía Anotada. Second Edition. 1997. Ponce, Puerto Rico: Universidad de Puerto Rico en Ponce. p. 244. Item 1240. 
 Luis Munoz Rivera. "Consummatum est." Obras Completas: prosa, febrero, 1889 - diciembre, 1890. San Juan, Puerto Rico: Instituto de Cultura Puertorriqueña.  pp. 154–157. (Colegio Universitario Tecnológico de Ponce, CUTPO).
 Fay Fowlie de Flores. Ponce, Perla del Sur: Una Bibliografía Anotada. Second Edition. 1997. Ponce, Puerto Rico: Universidad de Puerto Rico en Ponce. p. 335. Item 1668. 
 Ponce. Presupuesto municipal ordinario de gastos e ingresos para el año económico de 1891 a 1892. Ponce, Puerto Rico?: Tipografía El Vapor? s.f. (Universidad de Puerto Rico, Rio Piedras)
 Fay Fowlie de Flores. Ponce, Perla del Sur: Una Bibliografía Anotada. Second Edition. 1997. Ponce, Puerto Rico: Universidad de Puerto Rico en Ponce. p. 256. Item 1287. 
 Government of Puerto Rico. Circular del Gobierno General sobre incendios, Junio 6 de 1893. Ponce, Puerto Rico: Establecimiento Tipográfico de M. Lopez. 1893. (Archivo Histórico de Ponce, AHP)
 Fay Fowlie de Flores. Ponce, Perla del Sur: Una Bibliografía Anotada. Second Edition. 1997. Ponce, Puerto Rico: Universidad de Puerto Rico en Ponce. p. 335. Item 1669. 
 Ponce. Presupuesto municipal para el ejercicio 1893 a 1894. Ponce, Puerto Rico: Tipografía El Vapor, s.f. (Universidad de Puerto Rico, Rio Piedras)
 Fay Fowlie de Flores. Ponce, Perla del Sur: Una Bibliografía Anotada. Second Edition. 1997. Ponce, Puerto Rico: Universidad de Puerto Rico en Ponce. p. 116. Item 589. 
 Felix Bernier Matos. Cromos ponceños. (por Fray Justo) Ponce, Puerto Rico: Imprenta "La Libertad." 1896. Incluye cobertura sobre Tomas Armstrong. (Colegio Universitario Tecnológico de Ponce, CUTPO)
 Fay Fowlie de Flores. Ponce, Perla del Sur: Una Bibliografía Anotada. Second Edition. 1997. Ponce, Puerto Rico: Universidad de Puerto Rico en Ponce. p. 116. Item 589. 
 Felix Bernier Matos. Cromos ponceños. (por Fray Justo) Ponce, Puerto Rico: Imprenta "La Libertad." 1896. Incluye cobertura sobre Carlos Armstrong. (Colegio Universitario Tecnológico de Ponce, CUTPO)
 Fay Fowlie de Flores. Ponce, Perla del Sur: Una Bibliografía Anotada. Second Edition. 1997. Ponce, Puerto Rico: Universidad de Puerto Rico en Ponce. p. 335. Item 1670. 
 Ponce. Presupuesto municipal para el ejercicio de 1894 a 95. Ponce, Puerto Rico: Tipografía de "El Independiente", 1894?  (Biblioteca del Congreso [Washington, D.C.]; Colegio Universitario Tecnológico de Ponce, CUTPO [fotocopia])
 Fay Fowlie de Flores. Ponce, Perla del Sur: Una Bibliografía Anotada. Second Edition. 1997. Ponce, Puerto Rico: Universidad de Puerto Rico en Ponce. p. 334. Item 1664. 
 Ponce. Ayuntamiento. Informe sobre las necesidades de la ciudad de Ponce que deben tenerse presente al redactar el presupuesto municipal y que se publica por acuerdo  del Excmo. Ayuntamiento de esta ciudad. Ponce, Puerto Rico: Imprenta El Vapor. 1895. [fotocopia] (Colegio Universitario Tecnológico de Ponce, CUTPO)
 Fay Fowlie de Flores. Ponce, Perla del Sur: Una Bibliografía Anotada. Segunda Edición. 1997. Ponce, Puerto Rico: Universidad de Puerto Rico en Ponce. p. 337. Item 1676. 
 Ponce. Informe sobre las necesidades de la Ciudad de Ponce que deben tenerse presente al redactar el presupuesto municipal y que se publica por acuerdo del Excm. Ayuntamiento de esta Ciudad. Ponce, Puerto Rico: Imprenta El Vapor. 1895. Archivo Histórico Municipal de Ponce)
 Fay Fowlie de Flores. Ponce, Perla del Sur: Una Bibliografía Anotada. Second Edition. 1997. Ponce, Puerto Rico: Universidad de Puerto Rico en Ponce. p. 116. Item 589. 
 Felix Bernier Matos. Cromos ponceños. (por Fray Justo) Ponce, Puerto Rico: Imprenta "La Libertad." 1896. Incluye cobertura sobre Luis Alvarado. (Colegio Universitario Tecnológico de Ponce, CUTPO)
 Fay Fowlie de Flores. Ponce, Perla del Sur: Una Bibliografía Anotada. Second Edition. 1997. Ponce, Puerto Rico: Universidad de Puerto Rico en Ponce. p. 328. Item 1640. 
 Luis Muñoz Rivera. "Después del banquete." Obras completas: prosa, enero-diciembre, 1896. pp. 222–223. San Juan: Instituto de Cultura Puertorriqueña. 1963. Incluye cobertura sobre Luis Alvarado. (CUTPO)
 Fay Fowlie de Flores. Ponce, Perla del Sur: Una Bibliografía Anotada. Second Edition. 1997. Ponce, Puerto Rico: Universidad de Puerto Rico en Ponce. p. 336. Item 1672. 
 Ponce. Presupuesto ordinario de gastos e ingresos para el año económico de 1896 a 97. Ponce, Puerto Rico: Tip. El Vapor, s.f. (Universidad de Puerto Rico)
 Fay Fowlie de Flores. Ponce, Perla del Sur: Una Bibliografía Anotada. Second Edition. 1997. Ponce, Puerto Rico: Universidad de Puerto Rico en Ponce. p. 116. Item 589. 
 Felix Bernier Matos. Cromos ponceños. (por Fray Justo) Ponce, Puerto Rico: Imprenta "La Libertad." 1896. Incluye cobertura sobre Luis Gautier. (Colegio Universitario Tecnológico de Ponce, CUTPO)
 Fay Fowlie de Flores. Ponce, Perla del Sur: Una Bibliografía Anotada. Segunda Edición. 1997. Ponce, Puerto Rico: Universidad de Puerto Rico en Ponce. p. 339. Item 1687. 
 José G. del Valle. A través de diez años (1897–1907): trabajos políticos, económicos, históricos y sociales.  Barcelona, España:  Establecimiento Tipográfico de Feliú y Susanna. 1907. (Pontificia Universidad Católica de Ponce)
 Fay Fowlie de Flores. Ponce, Perla del Sur: Una Bibliografía Anotada. Second Edition. 1997. Ponce, Puerto Rico: Universidad de Puerto Rico en Ponce. p. 110. Item 566. 
 Guillermo Atiles Garcia. Kaleidoscopio. Ponce, Puerto Rico: Establecimiento tipográfico de Manuel López. 1905. Incluye cobertura sobre Ulpiano Colom. (Colegio Universitario Tecnológico de Ponce, CUTPO)
 Fay Fowlie de Flores. Ponce, Perla del Sur: Una Bibliografía Anotada. Second Edition. 1997. Ponce, Puerto Rico: Universidad de Puerto Rico en Ponce. p. 214. Item 1102. 
 Henry K. Carroll. Report on the Island of Puerto Rico: Its Population, Civil Government, Commerce, Industries, Productions, Roads, Tariff, and Currency, with Recommendations. Washington, DC. Government Printing Office, 1899. New York: Arno Press, 1975. pp. 570–579. (Colegio Universitario Tecnológico de Ponce, CUTPO / University of Puerto Rico - Rio Piedras, UPR).
 Fay Fowlie de Flores. Ponce, Perla del Sur: Una Bibliografía Anotada. Second Edition. 1997. Ponce, Puerto Rico: Universidad de Puerto Rico en Ponce. p. 210. Item 1078. 
 Juan Jose Barragán Landa. Los Benitez: raíces de una familia hacedora de historia. Rio Piedras: Puerto Rico. 1996. (Colegio Universitario Tecnológico de Ponce, CUTPO).
 Fay Fowlie de Flores. Ponce, Perla del Sur: Una Bibliografía Anotada. Second Edition. 1997. Ponce, Puerto Rico: Universidad de Puerto Rico en Ponce. p. 109. Item 560. 
 The Representative Men of Puerto Rico. Compiled and edited by F.E. Jackson & Son. C. Frederiksen, artist and photographer. s.l.: F.E. Jackson & Son. 1901. (PUCPR; Universidad Puerto Rico - Rio Piedras, UPR).
 Fay Fowlie de Flores. Ponce, Perla del Sur: Una Bibliografía Anotada. Second Edition. 1997. Ponce, Puerto Rico: Universidad de Puerto Rico en Ponce. p. 116. Item 589. 
 Felix Bernier Matos. Cromos ponceños. (por Fray Justo) Ponce, Puerto Rico: Imprenta "La Libertad." 1896. Incluye cobertura sobre Jose de Guzman Benitez. (Colegio Universitario Tecnológico de Ponce, CUTPO)
 Fay Fowlie de Flores. Ponce, Perla del Sur: Una Bibliografía Anotada. Second Edition. 1997. Ponce, Puerto Rico: Universidad de Puerto Rico en Ponce. pp. 319–320. Item 1603. 
 "Las ultimas elecciones en Puerto Rico: el gobierno americano protegiendo a los ladrones de voto." Puerto Rico Herald. 27 Noviembre 1902. pp. 295–298.
 Fay Fowlie de Flores. Ponce, Perla del Sur: Una Bibliografía Anotada. Second Edition. 1997. Ponce, Puerto Rico: Universidad de Puerto Rico en Ponce. p. 332. Item 1655. 
 Ponce. Oficina del Alcalde. Al pueblo de Ponce y el Hon. Gobernador de Puerto Rico. Tipografía Baldorioty. 1902. Includes information on Enrique Chevalier. (Universidad de Puerto Rico - Rio Piedras.)
 Fay Fowlie de Flores. Ponce, Perla del Sur: Una Bibliografía Anotada. Second Edition. 1997. Ponce, Puerto Rico: Universidad de Puerto Rico en Ponce. p. 319. Item 1600. 
 Reglamento para el cuerpo de la policía municipal de Ponce, tal como resulta de las ordenanzas números 104 y 136 del Consejo Municipal de dicha ciudad, aprobada por el alcalde [Antonio Arias (José Lloréns Echevarría, secretario)] en 9 de mayo de 1903. Ponce, Puerto Rico: Tipografía Baldorioty, 1903. (Universidad de Puerto Rico, Rio Piedras) 
 Fay Fowlie de Flores. Ponce, Perla del Sur: Una Bibliografía Anotada. Second Edition. 1997. Ponce, Puerto Rico: Universidad de Puerto Rico en Ponce. p. 332. Item 1655. 
 Ponce. Oficina del Alcalde. Al pueblo de Ponce y el Hon. Gobernador de Puerto Rico. Tipografía Baldorioty. 1903. Includes information on Antonio Arias. (Universidad de Puerto Rico - Rio Piedras.)
 Fay Fowlie de Flores. Ponce, Perla del Sur: Una Bibliografía Anotada. Second Edition. 1997. Ponce, Puerto Rico: Universidad de Puerto Rico en Ponce. p. 116. Item 589. 
 Felix Bernier Matos. Cromos ponceños. (por Fray Justo) Ponce, Puerto Rico: Imprenta "La Libertad." 1896. Incluye cobertura sobre Manuel Domenech. (Colegio Universitario Tecnológico de Ponce, CUTPO)
 Fay Fowlie de Flores. Ponce, Perla del Sur: Una Bibliografía Anotada. Segunda Edición. 1997. Ponce, Puerto Rico: Universidad de Puerto Rico en Ponce. p. 381. Item 1873. 
 Manuel V. Domenech. Mensaje al Concejo Municipal. Ponce. Oficina del Alcalde. 1904? (AHMP)
 Fay Fowlie de Flores. Ponce, Perla del Sur: Una Bibliografía Anotada. Second Edition. 1997. Ponce, Puerto Rico: Universidad de Puerto Rico en Ponce. p. 116. Item 589. 
 Felix Bernier Matos. Cromos ponceños. (por Fray Justo) Ponce, Puerto Rico: Imprenta "La Libertad." 1896. Incluye cobertura sobre Luis Valdivieso. (Colegio Universitario Tecnológico de Ponce, CUTPO)
 Fay Fowlie de Flores. Ponce, Perla del Sur: Una Bibliografía Anotada. Second Edition. 1997. Ponce, Puerto Rico: Universidad de Puerto Rico en Ponce. p. 332. Item 1655. 
 Ponce. Oficina del Alcalde. Al pueblo de Ponce y el Hon. Gobernador de Puerto Rico. Tipografía Baldorioty. 1905. Includes information on Luis P. Valdivieso. (Universidad de Puerto Rico - Rio Piedras.)
 Fay Fowlie de Flores. Ponce, Perla del Sur: Una Bibliografía Anotada. Second Edition. 1997. Ponce, Puerto Rico: Universidad de Puerto Rico en Ponce. p. 336. Item 1675. 
 Ponce. Gobierno Municipal. Informe actividades administrativas y económicas del Municipio de Ponce. (Also titled Informe del Alcalde de la Ciudad de Ponce) Ponce, Puerto Rico: Tip. Baldorioty. 1905 (Ver también años 1908 y 1917). (Archivo Histórico Municipal de Ponce)
 Fay Fowlie de Flores. Ponce, Perla del Sur: Una Bibliografía Anotada. Second Edition. 1997. Ponce, Puerto Rico: Universidad de Puerto Rico en Ponce. p. 330. Item 1650. 
 Santiago Oppenheimer Bettini. Informe al pueblo de Ponce y al Gobernador de Puerto Rico sobre las gestiones administrativas y el estado de la Hacienda municipal durante el año económico de 1905 a 1906 por el alcalde de la ciudad. Ponce, Puerto Rico: Tipografía de El Ideal Católico. 1906. (Archivo Histórico Municipal de Ponce)
 Fay Fowlie de Flores. Ponce, Perla del Sur: Una Bibliografía Anotada. Second Edition. 1997. Ponce, Puerto Rico: Universidad de Puerto Rico en Ponce. p. 332. Item 1655. 
 Ponce. Oficina del Alcalde. Al pueblo de Ponce y el Hon. Gobernador de Puerto Rico. Tipografía Baldorioty. 1906. Includes information on Santiago Oppenheimer. (Universidad de Puerto Rico - Rio Piedras.)
 Fay Fowlie de Flores. Ponce, Perla del Sur: Una Bibliografía Anotada. Second Edition. 1997. Ponce, Puerto Rico: Universidad de Puerto Rico en Ponce. p. 336. Item 1675. 
 Ponce. Gobierno Municipal. Informe actividades administrativas y económicas del Municipio de Ponce. (Also titled Informe del Alcalde de la Ciudad de Ponce) Ponce, Puerto Rico: Tip. Pasarell. 1908 (Ver también años 1905 y 1917). (Archivo Histórico Municipal de Ponce)
 Fay Fowlie de Flores. Ponce, Perla del Sur: Una Bibliografía Anotada. Segunda Edición. 1997. Ponce, Puerto Rico: Universidad de Puerto Rico en Ponce. p. 337. Item 1678. 
 Ponce. Proyecto de un Empréstito para obras municipales... Ponce, Puerto Rico: Imprenta La Defensa. 1911 (Archivo Histórico Municipal de Ponce, AHMP)
 Fay Fowlie de Flores. Ponce, Perla del Sur: Una Bibliografía Anotada. Second Edition. 1997. Ponce, Puerto Rico: Universidad de Puerto Rico en Ponce. p. 216. Item 1109. 
 Cayetano Coll y Toste. Boletín Histórico de Puerto Rico. San Juan, Puerto Rico: Cantera Fernandez. 1914–1927. (Colegio Universitario Tecnológico de Ponce, CUTPO).
 Fay Fowlie de Flores. Ponce, Perla del Sur: Una Bibliografía Anotada. Segunda Edición. 1997. Ponce, Puerto Rico: Universidad de Puerto Rico en Ponce. p. 175. Item 893. 
 Ramon E. Bauzá. Con la ventana abierta...era mejor cuando era peor. San Juan, Puerto Rico: Cordillera. 1996. (UPR-RP; CUTPO)
 Fay Fowlie de Flores. Ponce, Perla del Sur: Una Bibliografía Anotada. Second Edition. 1997. Ponce, Puerto Rico: Universidad de Puerto Rico en Ponce. p. 336. Item 1675. 
 Ponce. Gobierno Municipal. Informe actividades administrativas y económicas del Municipio de Ponce. (Also titled Informe del Alcalde de la Ciudad de Ponce) Ponce, Puerto Rico: Imprenta El Día. 1917 (Ver también años 1905 y 1908). (Archivo Histórico Municipal de Ponce)
 Fay Fowlie de Flores. Ponce, Perla del Sur: Una Bibliografía Anotada. Second Edition. 1997. Ponce, Puerto Rico: Universidad de Puerto Rico en Ponce. p. 116. Item 589. 
 Felix Bernier Matos. Cromos ponceños. (por Fray Justo) Ponce, Puerto Rico: Imprenta "La Libertad." 1896. Incluye cobertura sobre Francisco Parra Capo. (Colegio Universitario Tecnológico de Ponce, CUTPO)
 Fay Fowlie de Flores. Ponce, Perla del Sur: Una Bibliografía Anotada. Second Edition. 1997. Ponce, Puerto Rico: Universidad de Puerto Rico en Ponce. p. 338. Item 1684. 
 Jose Joaquin Rodriguez. "Partido Socialista y el Ligao de Ponce." Punto y Coma. Año 2 (1990) pp. 21–24. (Colegio Universitario Tecnológico de Ponce, CUTPO)
 Fay Fowlie de Flores. Ponce, Perla del Sur: Una Bibliografía Anotada. Segunda Edición. 1997. Ponce, Puerto Rico: Universidad de Puerto Rico en Ponce. p. 339. Item 1689. 
 Guillermo Vivas Valdivieso. Datos importantes de la vida municipal de la ciudad de Ponce, Puerto Rico, especialmente del periodo comprendido entre los años 1924–1928. Ponce, Puerto Rico: Talleres "El Día". 1936. (PUCPR; CUTPO [fotocopia])
 Fay Fowlie de Flores. Ponce, Perla del Sur: Una Bibliografía Anotada. Second Edition. 1997. Ponce, Puerto Rico: Universidad de Puerto Rico en Ponce. p. 320. Item 1606. 
 Alquiniel. "Don Guillermo Vivas Valdivieso." Meridiano. Año 1. (Agosto 1958) pp. 12, 33, 37. Incluye photo. (Colegio Universitario Tecnológico de Ponce, CUTPO).
 Fay Fowlie de Flores. Ponce, Perla del Sur: Una Bibliografía Anotada. Second Edition. 1997. Ponce, Puerto Rico: Universidad de Puerto Rico en Ponce. p. 110. Item 566. 
 Guillermo Atiles Garcia. Kaleidoscopio. Ponce, Puerto Rico: Establecimiento tipográfico de Manuel López. 1905. Incluye cobertura sobre Guillermo Vivas Valdivieso. (Colegio Universitario Tecnológico de Ponce, CUTPO)
 Fay Fowlie de Flores. Ponce, Perla del Sur: Una Bibliografía Anotada. Second Edition. 1997. Ponce, Puerto Rico: Universidad de Puerto Rico en Ponce. p. 326. Item 1635. 
 Joaquin Monteagudo. "Al cesar como alcalde, Guillermo Vivas Valdivieso dejó en los bancos, a favor del municipio, $542,000.00 y $30,000.00 en el gobierno insular para una carretera." Helices. Vol. 3 (Febrero de 1952) pp. 14–15, 85 (UPR-Rio Piedras)
 Fay Fowlie de Flores. Ponce, Perla del Sur: Una Bibliografía Anotada. Segunda Edición. 1997. Ponce, Puerto Rico: Universidad de Puerto Rico en Ponce. p. 339. Item 1688. 
 Guillermo Vivas Valdivieso. "A los agricultores del Distrito Municipal de Ponce, P.R." Ponce, Puerto Rico. 1926. 1 hoja. (Archivo Histórico Municipal de Ponce)
 Fay Fowlie de Flores. Ponce, Perla del Sur: Una Bibliografía Anotada. Second Edition. 1997. Ponce, Puerto Rico: Universidad de Puerto Rico en Ponce. p. 332. Item 1656. 
 Municipio de Ponce. Exposición publica a los contribuyentes y a todos los vecinos de la Ciudad de Ponce, sobre la situación económica del Municipio y sobre el estado general de todas sus dependencias y servicios, al terminar su gestión administrativa el Alcalde saliente don Guillermo Vivas Valdivieso, en enero 14 de 1929, fecha en que se hicieron cargo de la administración municipal los actuales funcionarios electos por la voluntad soberana del pueblo. San Juan, Puerto Rico: Cantero, Fernandez & Co. 1929. (Pontificia Universidad Católica de Puerto Rico)
 Fay Fowlie de Flores. Ponce, Perla del Sur: Una Bibliografía Anotada. Second Edition. 1997. Ponce, Puerto Rico: Universidad de Puerto Rico en Ponce. p. 333. Item 1658. 
 Municipio de Ponce. Oficina del Alcalde. Informe de la gestión administrativa del Municipio de Ponce, P.R., 1932-1937, con ilustraciones y comentarios. Ponce, Puerto Rico: s.n., 1944. (Colegio Universitario Tecnológico de Ponce, CUTPO)
 Fay Fowlie de Flores. Ponce, Perla del Sur: Una Bibliografía Anotada. Second Edition. 1997. Ponce, Puerto Rico: Universidad de Puerto Rico en Ponce. p. 173. Item 880. 
 Carnaval de Ponce: programa. Ponce, Puerto Rico. 1973. Includes photos. Incluye cobertura sobre Blas Oliveras. (Archivo Histórico Municipal de Ponce, AHMP; Colegio Universitario Tecnológico de Ponce, CUTPO)
 Fay Fowlie de Flores. Ponce, Perla del Sur: Una Bibliografía Anotada. Segunda Edición. 1997. Ponce, Puerto Rico: Universidad de Puerto Rico en Ponce. p. 340. Item 1690. 
 Carlos R. Zapata Oliveras. Situación política, económica y administrativa de Ponce durante la incumbencia de Blas Oliveras (enero 1933-enero 1937). Programa Graduado de Historia, Facultad de Humanidades, Universidad de Puerto Rico, Recinto de Río Piedras. 1980. 242 pages. (Tesis de Maestría [Master's Thesis]) (In Spanish) (UPR-RP; CUTPO-fotocopia)
 Fay Fowlie de Flores. Ponce, Perla del Sur: Una Bibliografía Anotada. Segunda Edición. 1997. Ponce, Puerto Rico: Universidad de Puerto Rico en Ponce. p. 338. Item 1683. 
 M. Rivera de la Vega. "La deuda municipal." Puerto Rico. [Barranquilla, Colombia?: s.n., Colección America?]  Volumen 1 (Febrero de 1936) pp. 339–345. (Colegio Universitario Tecnológico de Ponce, CUTPO)
 Fay Fowlie de Flores. Ponce, Perla del Sur: Una Bibliografía Anotada. Second Edition. 1997. Ponce, Puerto Rico: Universidad de Puerto Rico en Ponce. p. 173. Item 880. 
 Carnaval de Ponce: programa. Ponce, Puerto Rico. 1973. Includes photos. Incluye cobertura sobre Jose Tormos Diego. (Archivo Histórico Municipal de Ponce, AHMP; Colegio Universitario Tecnológico de Ponce, CUTPO)
 Fay Fowlie de Flores. Ponce, Perla del Sur: Una Bibliografía Anotada. Segunda Edición. 1997. Ponce, Puerto Rico: Universidad de Puerto Rico en Ponce. p. 379. Item 1865. 
 German Castanera Gomez. "Cualquier alcalde hubiese actuado como Tormos Diego." El Diluvio. 26 de enero de 1938. p. 11. (CUTPO)
 Fay Fowlie de Flores. Ponce, Perla del Sur: Una Bibliografía Anotada. Segunda Edición. 1997. Ponce, Puerto Rico: Universidad de Puerto Rico en Ponce. p. 26. Item 126. 
 "Edificios públicos en Ponce." Puerto Rico Ilustrado. 5 de noviembre de 1938. p. 30. Includes photo of Jose Tormos Diego. (CUTPO)
 Fay Fowlie de Flores. Ponce, Perla del Sur: Una Bibliografía  Anotada. Second Edition. 1997. Ponce, Puerto Rico: Universidad de Puerto Rico en Ponce. pp. 321. Item 1609. 
 Victor Bono Rodriguez. "La obra de la actual administración municipal de Ponce [bajo Andfres Grillasca Salas]." El Dia. 18 Diciembre 1949. pp. 51–53.
 Fay Fowlie de Flores. Ponce, Perla del Sur: Una Bibliografía Anotada. Second Edition. 1997. Ponce, Puerto Rico: Universidad de Puerto Rico en Ponce. p. 173. Item 880. 
 Carnaval de Ponce: programa. Ponce, Puerto Rico. 1973. Includes photos. Incluye cobertura sobre Juan Luis Boscio. (Archivo Histórico Municipal de Ponce, AHMP; Colegio Universitario Tecnológico de Ponce, CUTPO)
 Fay Fowlie de Flores. Ponce, Perla del Sur: Una Bibliografía Anotada. Second Edition. 1997. Ponce, Puerto Rico: Universidad de Puerto Rico en Ponce. p. 319. Item 1602. 
 "Toma de Posesión [de Jose N. Dapena Laguna, como Fiscal Interino del la Corte de Distrito de Ponce]." Revista Gráfica del Sur Diciembre 1941. Supplement page between pages 26 and 27. (Colegio Universitario Tecnológico de Ponce, CUTPO).
 Fay Fowlie de Flores. Ponce, Perla del Sur: Una Bibliografía Anotada. Second Edition. 1997. Ponce, Puerto Rico: Universidad de Puerto Rico en Ponce. p. 173. Item 880. 
 Carnaval de Ponce: programa. Ponce, Puerto Rico. 1973. Includes photos. Incluye cobertura sobre Carlos J. Cintron. (Archivo Histórico Municipal de Ponce, AHMP; Colegio Universitario Tecnológico de Ponce, CUTPO)
 Fay Fowlie de Flores. Ponce, Perla del Sur: Una Bibliografía Anotada. Second Edition. 1997. Ponce, Puerto Rico: Universidad de Puerto Rico en Ponce. p. 22. Item 111. 
 United States. 86th Congress. House of Representatives Committee on Interior and Insular Affairs. Hearing before a Special Subcommittee on Territorial and Insular Affairs...H.R. 9234, a Bill to Provide for Amendments to the Compact between the People of Puerto Rico and the United States, and Related Legislation. Washington, D.C. Government Printing Office, 1960. Includes report by interim mayor Helvetia Nicole. (Colegio Universitario Tecnológico de Ponce, CUTPO)
 Fay Fowlie de Flores. Ponce, Perla del Sur: Una Bibliografía Anotada. Second Edition. 1997. Ponce, Puerto Rico: Universidad de Puerto Rico en Ponce. p. 173. Item 880. 
 Carnaval de Ponce: programa. Ponce, Puerto Rico. 1996. Includes photos. (Archivo Histórico Municipal de Ponce, AHMP; Colegio Universitario Tecnológico de Ponce, CUTPO)
 Fay Fowlie de Flores. Ponce, Perla del Sur: Una Bibliografía Anotada. Second Edition. 1997. Ponce, Puerto Rico: Universidad de Puerto Rico en Ponce. p. 173. Item 880. 
 Carnaval de Ponce: programa. Ponce, Puerto Rico. 1973. Includes photos. Incluye cobertura sobre Eduardo Ruberte. (Archivo Histórico Municipal de Ponce, AHMP; Colegio Universitario Tecnológico de Ponce, CUTPO)
 Fay Fowlie de Flores. Ponce, Perla del Sur: Una Bibliografía Anotada. Second Edition. 1997. Ponce, Puerto Rico: Universidad de Puerto Rico en Ponce. p. 173. Item 880. 
 Carnaval de Ponce: programa. Ponce, Puerto Rico. 1973. Includes photos. Incluye cobertura sobre Juan H. Cintron. (Archivo Histórico Municipal de Ponce, AHMP; Colegio Universitario Tecnológico de Ponce, CUTPO)
 Fay Fowlie de Flores. Ponce, Perla del Sur: Una Bibliografía Anotada. Second Edition. 1997. Ponce, Puerto Rico: Universidad de Puerto Rico en Ponce. p. 18. Item 91. 
 Ponce. Gobierno Municipal. Estampas ponceñas. Ponce, Puerto Rico, 1976. (Colegio Universitario Tecnológico de Ponce; Museo de la Historia de Ponce)
 Fay Fowlie de Flores. Ponce, Perla del Sur: Una Bibliografía Anotada. Segunda Edición. 1997. Ponce, Puerto Rico: Universidad de Puerto Rico en Ponce. p. 337. Item 1679. 
 Ponce. Revision del Plan comprensivo del Municipio de Ponce. Hon. Jose G. Tormos Vega, Alcalde. M. Sosa y Asoc., consultores. Ponce, Puerto Rico. 1977. (Colegio Universitario Tecnológico de Ponce)
 Fay Fowlie de Flores. Ponce, Perla del Sur: Una Bibliografía Anotada. Segunda Edición. 1997. Ponce, Puerto Rico: Universidad de Puerto Rico en Ponce. p. 337. Item 1677. 
 Ponce. Manual sobre el gobierno municipal. Ponce, Puerto Rico: Imprenta Municipal. 1982. (Archivo Histórico Municipal de Ponce, AHMP; Colegio Universitario Tecnológico de Ponce)
 Fay Fowlie de Flores. Ponce, Perla del Sur: Una Bibliografía Anotada. Segunda Edición. 1997. Ponce, Puerto Rico: Universidad de Puerto Rico en Ponce. p. 4. Item 22. 
 "Ponce." El Reportero. 9 de mayo de 1985. (Supplement) pp. S1-S52. Interview with Jose Joaquín Dapena Thompson. 
 Fay Fowlie de Flores. Ponce, Perla del Sur: Una Bibliografía Anotada. Second Edition. 1997. Ponce, Puerto Rico: Universidad de Puerto Rico en Ponce. p. 124. Item 624. 
 Mariano Vidal Armstrong. Quien es quien en Ponce y leyendas de antaño. Ponce, Puerto Rico: Imprenta Fortuño. 1986. (Colegio Universitario Tecnológico de Ponce, CUTPO; Recinto Universitario de Mayaguez, RUM)

Ponce

mayor